Jayachitra is an Indian actress films who works mostly in Tamil, Telugu and Kannada films.

Early life 
Jayachitra was born in 1957. Her father Mahendra was a veterinary doctor, who had earlier worked as a lawyer. Her mother Ammaji (a.k.a. Jayasree) was an actress who had acted in films such as the Tamil film Mahaveeran (1955) and Telugu films Rojulu Marai and Daiva Balam (1959). They moved to Chennai for work, which was where Jayachitra was born and raised as Rohini. Her grandmother looked after her when her parents were busy with work. With her mother's encouragement, she became a child star at the age of six in the Telugu film Bhakta Potana.

Lead actress 
When Jayachitra was in her early teens, she screen-tested for a Telugu film titled Beedala Paatlu, but the director felt she was too young and rejected her for the role. However, he did recommend her to K.S. Gopalakrishnan, who was looking for a young, spirited heroine, for the Tamil film Korathi Magan, (1972).  He immediately cast her, because he loved the way she delivered her lines. He signed her for three films under his banner and gave her the name Jayachitra. She continued in heroine roles in Ponnukku Thanga Manasu (1973) and played Sivaji's daughter in Bharata Vilas and was one of the 9 heroines in MGR's Navaratnam. She worked for big-name directors, such as K. Balachander in Sollathaan Ninaikiren and Arangetram.  She was Kamal Haasan's heroine in the Tamil film Ilamai Oonjal Aadukirathu (1978) and its Telugu remake Vayasu Pilichindi (1978).  As an actress, she was known for her courage and spontaneity as she continued to star in Tamil and Telugu films. She faced a snake up close in Vellikizhamai Viratham (1974), and then a tiger in the Telugu film Cheppindi Chesta (1978). She made other unforgettable films: Ponnukku Thanga Manasu, Sathyam, Kalyanamam Kalyanam, Vandikaran Magan, Cinema Paithiyam (remake of the Hindi hit film Guddi (1971)).  Most of her Tamil films are with Kamal Haasan. She memorably played the title role in the Telugu film Kalpana (1977), a remake of the Hindi hit film Anamika (1973).

Later roles 
Later, she became a character actress in K. Balachander's film Pudhu Pudhu Arthangal (1989). After completing 200 films, she turned to television with the serial Sumangali, which she produced, directed and acted in. It became a hit, and she was soon acting and producing other serials, Alaigal and Sivaranjini (2005). She was unanimously elected chairperson of the action committee of the TV Serial Producers' Guild of South India, which in turn led to her involvement in politics. She joined the Congress party and has remained fairly active. She has won numerous awards, including Tamil Nadu's Kalaimamani Award.

As director 
She cast herself as the heroine in the Tamil film Pudhiya Raagam (1991), which marked her debut as a director and producer.  Unfortunately, the film flopped. In 2010, she cast her son Amresh Ganesh as the hero in the Tamil film Naane Ennul Illai (2010), which she wrote, produced, and directed.

Personal life 
After more than a decade as a heroine, Jayachitra decided to concentrate on her personal life by marrying an industrialist named Ganesh in 1983. She has a son with him named Amresh, whom she is trying to promote in show business, just as her mother had done with her. Despite giving him a debut through Naane Ennul Illai (2010), the film's failure made it difficult for Amresh to succeed as an actor. In 2011, it was announced that he would work on projects titled Kaliyuga Kadhalan and Machan Ava En Aalu Da, with the former being set in three different eras, but neither film was completed. Later in the year, Jayachitra announced that she was working on three more films with Amresh in the lead role, Mundru Mugangal, Nedunchalai and Scene Podathey, but again neither film materialised. He also shot for a comedy film titled Kadan Vaangi Kalyanam alongside Mansoor Ali Khan during late 2011, but the film also did not release. In 2013, he briefly worked on the making of another incomplete film Thaaru Maaru, which had a grand launch event. In 2015, he was signed on by Raghava Lawrence to work on the music for his forthcoming film Motta Siva Ketta Shiva.  Her husband Ganesh died on 3 December 2020.

Partial filmography

Tamil films

Telugu films 
 Soggadu (1975)
 Bharatamlo Oka Ammayi (1975)
 Yavvanam Katesindi (1976)
 Maa Daivam (1976)
 Chillarakottu Chittemma (1977)
 Savasagaallu (1977)
 Tholireyi Gadichindi (1977)
 Aatmiyudu (1977)
 Kalpana (1977)
 Manchi Babayi (1978)
 Nindu Manishi (1978)
 Cheppindi Chestha (1978)
 Love Marriage (1978)
 Katakataala Rudraiah (1978)
 Mugguru Muggure (1978)
 Vayasu Pilichindi (1978)
 Annadammula Savaal (1978)
 Rickshaw Raji (1978)
 Muttaiduva (1979)
 Allari Vayasu (1979)
 Tirupati Shri Venkateswara Kalyanam (1979)
 Allari Pillalu (1979)
 Ravanude Ramudayithe? (1979)
 Kaksha (1980)
 Naa Mogudu Brhmachari (1981)
 Bobbili Puli (1982)
 Ee Prasnaku Baduledi (1986)
 Kashmora (1986)
 Muvva Gopaludu (1987)
 Mama Alludu (1990)
 Abbaigaru (1993)
 Rajeswari Kalyanam (1993)
Hello Alludu (1994) as Sumithra Devi
 Gharana Bullodu (1995)
 Attaa ... Nee Koduku Jaagratta (1997)
 Hello Alludu (2000)
 Samarasimha Reddy (2001)
 Kondaveeti Simhasanam (2002)
 Adrustam (2002)
 Narasimhudu (2005)
 Prema Lokam (2005)
 Kashmora (2005)

Malayalam films 
 Nee Ente Lahari (1976)
 Pappu (1980)

Kannada films 
 Mannina Maga (1968)
 Huliya Haalina Mevu (1979) as Thanga
 Kulla Kulli (1980) as Kulli / Chitra
 Mane Mane Kathe (1981) as Jaya
 Aparanji (1984)
 Sathva Pareekshe (1987)
 Premaloka (1987)
 Ranadheera (1988)
 Lockup Death (1994)
 Vijayadashami (2003) as Mahalakshmi
 Attahasa (2013) as Jayalalithaa

Television 
 Alaigal (Sun TV) as Savithri 
 Sivaranjani
 Ranga Vilas (Jaya TV)
 Mr & Mrs Gundanna (Udaya TV)

Awards
She won Nandi Award for Best Supporting Actress - Rajeswari Kalyanam (1992)

References

External links 
 

Actresses from Chennai
1957 births
Living people
Indian film actresses
Actresses in Tamil cinema
Actresses in Telugu cinema
Actresses in Kannada cinema
Actresses in Malayalam cinema
Indian women film directors
Tamil film directors
Tamil television actresses
Indian television actresses
20th-century Indian actresses
21st-century Indian actresses
20th-century Indian film directors
Film directors from Chennai
Film producers from Chennai
Indian women film producers
Tamil film producers
21st-century Indian film directors
Actresses in Tamil television
Businesswomen from Tamil Nadu